There are almost 900 living fellows of the Australian Academy of Technology and Engineering. The post-nominal is FTSE.

The following lists many notable living and deceased Fellows.

Post-nominal statistics

Numbers of active/living Fellows in the on-line database

See also
National Academies Forum (NAF)
Australian Academy of Science (AAS) – Fellows of the Australian Academy of Science (FAA)
Australian Academy of the Humanities (AHA) – Fellows of the Australian Academy of the Humanities (FAHA)
Academy of the Social Sciences in Australia (ASSA) – Fellows of the Academy of the Social Sciences in Australia (FASSA) 
Australian Academy of Technological Sciences and Engineering (ATSE) – Fellows of the Australian Academy of Technological Sciences and Engineering (FTSE)
Australian Academy of Health and Medical Sciences (AAHMS) - Fellows of the Australian Academy of Health and Medical Sciences (FAHMS)

References

External links
ATSE Workshop: Increasing the innovation dividend from emerging technologies, Program and speakers biographies, 23 August 2011, Customs House, Brisbane
ATSE Workshop: Strengthening Links Between Industry and Public Sector Research Organisations, 17–18 May 2011, Sydney
Deceased ATSE Fellows 2009-2017, www.atse.org.au

 
 
 
Australia
Australia
Australian Academy of Technological Sciences and Engineering
fellows of the Australian Academy of Technological Sciences and Engineering